Kuzmichi is a rural locality (a settlement) and the administrative center of Kuzmichyovskoye Rural Settlement, Gorodishchensky District, Volgograd Oblast, Russia. The population was 2,357 as of 2010. There are 27 streets.

Geography 
Kuzmichi is located 19 km northwest of Gorodishche (the district's administrative centre) by road. Posyolok Oblastnoy selskokhozyaystvennoy opytnoy stantsii is the nearest rural locality.

References 

Rural localities in Gorodishchensky District, Volgograd Oblast